Baambrugse Zuwe is a hamlet in the Dutch province of Utrecht. It is located in the municipality of De Ronde Venen, northeast of Vinkeveen. The hamlet consists of one road, close to 4 km long, going straight through the lake area the Vinkeveense Plassen.

It was first mentioned in 1851 as Vinkeveensche-Zuwe (De), and means side-wards dike belonging to Baambrugge (originally Vinkeveen). Baambrugse Zuwe is not a statistical entity, and the postal authorities have placed it under Vinkeveen. There are no place name signs, and it consists of about 240 houses.

References

Populated places in Utrecht (province)
De Ronde Venen